Shiras may refer to:

George Shiras Jr. (1832–1924), Associate Justice of the Supreme Court of the United States
George Shiras III (1859–1942), U.S. Representative from the state of Pennsylvania
Leif Shiras (born 1959), American tennis player and journalist
Oliver Perry Shiras (1833–1916), first United States federal judge on the United States District Court for the Northern District of Iowa
Wilmar H. Shiras (1908–1990), American science fiction author

See also
Shiras., taxonomic author abbreviation for Yasuyoshi Shirasawa (1868–1947), Japanese botanist
Shiras station, station on the Port Authority of Allegheny County's light rail network, located in the Beechview neighborhood of Pittsburgh, Pennsylvania
Shira (disambiguation)
Shiraz (disambiguation)